Aslan-Hussein Khan I or Aslan ibn Shahmardan (1781—1836) was the khan (governor) of the Gazikumukh (Kura) Khanate from 1820 to 1836 and the khan of the Avar Khanate from 1827 to 1828.

Biography

Early years 
After the death of his father in 1788, he was declared the ruler, but already in 1789 he was overthrown by his uncle Surkhay II, the owner of Gazikumukh. As a result, Aslan fled to Iran and from there he moved to the Ottoman Empire. for some time he was in the service of the pasha of the eyalet of Childir.

In 1803, Aslan Khan began secret negotiations with the Russian commander Ivan Gudovich about accepting citizenship of the Russian Empire in exchange for the return of property and his possessions to Kurakh. In 1809 he arrived at V. Repin, the commandant of Baku. In the same year, together with the Russians he took part in a military campaign in southern Dagestan, where he defeated his cousin Nuh-bey.

However, during 1812 there were border skirmishes with the sons of Surkhay II. At the same time, Aslan's brothers Hasan-aga and Fatali-aga managed to escape from Gazikumukh to Kurakh.

Relations with the Russian Empire 
According to Peter von Uslar, in 1812 the Caucasian administration formed the Kyra Khanate in south Dagestan, which united the territory of Kura, with the southern Gazikumukh possession – Kurakh, which became the capital of the khanate. Aslan Khan, Surkhay's nephew, was placed at the head, and was immediately promoted to colonel.

Surkhay II was declared deposed on January 19, 1820, due to anti-government activities. On June 12, 1820, near the village of Khozrekh, he was defeated and retreated to Gazikumukh, at that time Aslan occupied the village of Kuli, trying to block the path of his uncle, who first went to Avaria and then fled to Iran. On June 14, Russian troops entered Gazikumukh.

Aslan Khan was entrusted to manage Kumukh and also inherited Kura, which was restored by the Russians into an independent khanate. In 1826, Surkhay II returned from Iran to Andalal, the northern part of the Gazikumukh possession, and died in 1827 in the village of Sogratl.

Then Aslan Khan was approved as ruler of Gazikumukh by the Russian government. The commander of the Russian detachment of Aleksey Yermolov – Valerian Madatov announced the granting of the rank of major general to Aslan Khan, handed him an imperial charter, a banner with the Russian coat of arms, a precious saber and the Order of St. George of the 4th class – "For distinction in the conquest of Tabasaran, Kaitag and Gazikumukh."

At the same time, the increase in the tax burden and additional payments on the Russian troops and administration stationed in Dagestan gradually set the population up for resistance. With this in mind, the Khan began to pursue an anti-Russian policy: he supported the emergence of Muridism in his lands, and was the patron of Sheikh Muhammad Kurawi. Aslan Khan even forbade the movement of Russian troops several times through Kurakh and Gazi-Kumukh, which led to the ruin of the local population. Nevertheless, in 1831 he assisted the Russians in the fight against Imam Gazi-Muhammad.

He died in 1836 and was succeeded by the eldest son Nutsal Aga-khan.

Awards 

 Order of St. George - 4th class
 Medal "For Loyalty and Courage"

See also 

 Surkhay II
 Sultan Ahmed Khan I
 Gazikumukh Khanate
 Avar Khanate

References

Sources 

 Kurbanov, Ahmed (2009). The activities of Aslan-bey Kurinsky in the context of the political history of Russia in the Caucasus (late 18th – early 19th century) // Herzen University – No. 89.
 Potto, Vasily (2017). Caucasian war. The time of Paskevich or the rebellion of Chechnya. Vol. 5. Litres. 
 Dubrovin, Nikolay (2022). History of war and domination of Russians in the Caucasus. Appointment of Aleksey Yermolov as viceroy in the Caucasus. Vol. 6. Litres. 
 Gadzhiev, Bulach (2022). Царские и шамилевские крепости в Дагестане. Litres.

External links 

 Caucasian war. Volume 2. The time of Yermolov 18-th century. Hike to Gazikumyk in 1820 – statehistory.ru.
 Kura Khanate and its entry into Russia – dissercat.com.

Avar Khans
Khans
Avar Khanate
Khans of Gazikumukh
1781 births
18th-century births
19th-century deaths
19th-century rulers
19th-century rulers in Asia
19th-century rulers in Europe
1836 deaths
Recipients of the Order of St. George of the Fourth Degree
History of Dagestan
Laks (Caucasus)